is an action-adventure video game developed by Riverhillsoft for the PlayStation. It is the sequel to the game Overblood, released on the same platform. The game was published in Japan by Riverhillsoft on July 23, 1998, while a European version saw release from Evolution games on June 3rd, 1999. The plot takes place in 2115, and revolves around a team of freedom fighters in a war against a corrupt corporation that plans on escaping to another planet and leaving all life on Earth for dead.

Gameplay
The game features an introduction and seven episodes, plus a hidden bonus episode unlocked by earning 2000 Clear Points. Between most of the episodes, which are all set in different locations, the player generally has the option to explore the main city where the game begins in order to buy items, weapons, talk to non player characters and find hidden perks in the game.

A free-camera view allows the player to control their view within the 3D environment.

Plot
The game follows protagonist Acarno Brani, an ambitious twenty-four year old Junk Blade pilot, arriving at East Edge City Airport after relocating from Greyland. Acarno and Curtis have a brief chat in the airport terminal before Curtis leaves for the door, as Curtis is leaving Acarno has a premonition of Curtis being attacked. Curtis is then ambushed by a powerful, mutating villain called Kondo. After throwing a mysterious capsule across the floor in Acarno's direction, Curtis is taken by Kondo. This is the first point at which the player encounters combat, armed only with a sword, and must swiftly exit the airport after avoiding people trying to shoot at him. Acarno jumps out of the airport window, falling hundreds of feet into the sea.

After climbing out of the water, Acarno is given the choice to examine the capsule. Upon doing so he hears the name "D-NA" between a lot of static, before the message being played cuts out. The game then turns into a free roam game, giving the player the ability to travel throughout East Edge City. Eventually Acarno will come across a bar named "D-NA", and inquire with the bartender, Raz Karcy (the main character from the first OverBlood game), who begins telling him about the passenger who gave him the capsule which led him to the bar. Raz informs Acarno about a conspiracy involving the project being worked on by Hayano Industries. With time being of the essence, Raz offers Acarno 50,000 credits towards the entrance fee to enter the local Junk Blade race in exchange for helping with his plan to uncover the secret of the project.

Meanwhile, Kondo reports to his boss, Hayano, about the failure to retrieve the capsule and the interference of Acarno, who Kondo believes is a spy. Acarno travels to Billboard Island to recruit Navarro Jean, an old colleague of Raz and acquire a map of Hayano's Pagoda. Meanwhile, Raz is confronted by Chris Lanebecca. Acarno fights and solves puzzles to get through the Billboard Island Facility, eventually going up against a large security robot. Acarno destroys the robot, but is then tased by a robot of the same model as Pipo, a companion from the first game. Navarro Jean interrogates Acarno about his motives, but the interrogation is cut short when the ITP ambushes Billboard Island on Hayano's orders. Acarno is freed in the hectic scramble, and mans a turret to fend off the attack.

Acarno, Chris, and Navarro infiltrate the perimeter, check in with each other before going radio silent, then launch the attack. The Pagoda is filled with enemies, puzzles, and traps, and the trio must fight their way through the Pagoda to the three respective guardians, a crab-like robot, a frog-like robot, and a squid-like robot. The player decides who uses which entrance, and thus who fights which guardian. The trio then break into the mainframe. Navarro hacks the main terminal of ZEUS while Chris and Acarno keep lookout. The computer reveals that the secret government project is codenamed: Meridian. The KPACS only has approximately ten years before the energy is depleted, so Project: Meridian was designed as an immigration ship that uses KPACS energy to ferry the Earth's elite to a colony world with fresh resources, but can only hold 20,000 people. The team ponders why Raz and Veltor would be needed for the project before deciding to escape first, and figure out the details later. As they are headed for the door Acarno remembers that Nina said she was in the Pagoda. Acarno runs back into the central room and tries to knock down the door to a restricted safe-room while calling out Nina's name as Chris and Navarro try to stop him. This triggers the alarm and Kondo is dispatched to kill the invaders.

As Acarno admits defeat and leaves with the other two all three are knocked to the ground by a shockwave as Kondo appears. As the intruders recover from the blast Chris and Acarno recognize Kondo. Acarno says he can take Kondo on his own and rushes in to fight. Acarno is badly beaten however, and just as Kondo moves in for the killing strike Kondo is paralyzed by a lightning bolt and Nina appears. Acarno is stunned to see Nina there, and Nina apologizes for making Acarno get involved, and almost getting him killed, she then mentions the search to find the Parallax Key, then disappears before Acarno can ask what she means. When Kondo wakes up Acarno demands to know where his sister is. Kondo explains that Nina was abducted because of her supernatural powers, and was experimented on in an attempt to clone the gene that gave her those powers. The experiment lead to Nina's death which is why she appears the same age as when she was taken, and that the Nina Acarno was talking to is an A.I. simulation. Acarno flies into a fit of rage and begins channeling a field of energy. He fights Kondo again, this time brutally beating Kondo. As Kondo calls for backup Hayano orders him to release the intruders. Kondo begrudgingly obeys.

In the elevator to the lobby the gang discuss Acarno's ability to harness Xeno-Rays, which is a power only one in five-million have. Chris says that they have to do something about the KPACS reserves running out before the ten-year deadline. Navarro explains that the Meridian launch is going to exhaust the reserves of energy keeping KPACS operational, killing all life on Earth, meaning they have only weeks to come up with a plan. Meanwhile, Hayano is alone in his office planning on how to counter the next attack by the rebels, and what to do about Acarno and his special power.

Development
The game was announced in August 1997.Mark Estdale, an industry veteran, looked back on his work on the localization of the game in an interview with GameCulture. He stated, "I read the script. It was awful, translated to English from Japanese by Italians so I suggested rewriting the English to match the stylized Japanese, or making it into an acted comedy or to scrap the whole thing. I was told the script was perfect and couldn’t be changed and that we must do it with seriousness. We squirmed and the actors wept. When the game finally came out we discovered amongst many painfully awful mistranslations that the hand bomb throwing device was a grenade launcher and the whorehouse key level was actually a warehouse."

The director of the game was Akihiro Hino, who previously worked as a programmer on the first game. He would later become the CEO of developer Level-5, which he founded just a few months after the release of the game. He would later reflect back on his experience developing the series, stating, "On Overblood 1, I was programming all by myself. On Overblood2, I was directing, planning and writing scenarios. Those were some of my most hardworking days. That’s the way I liked it, but I really couldn’t sleep then."

Reception
In an import review of the game, GameSpot criticized the excessively long cutscenes, along with the slow performance of the game engine.

The OverBlood series was the subject of the online video blog series Super Replay by the editors of Game Informer magazine. During the Super Replay, the editors criticized the lack of the ability to skip cutscenes, the convoluted storyline and the general lack of direction. They occasionally praised it for its ambition.

OPM UK criticised the game as a "pale imitation of Final Fantasy VII with its heart ripped out" and gave it a score of 4 out of 10.

PAL Repress
In 1999, when the PAL version was first released in Europe, players reported a game-breaking glitch in Episode 2, where upon entering a doorway with any of the three characters, the game would freeze due to the amount of enemy assets that spawned on the other side. This was later patched, albeit two years later, in 2001, by repressing the game entirely. This release was branded under EON Digital Entertainment, rendering the earlier Event release in 1999, a defective product. This ultimately led to its cult obscurity and already poor ratings. Since the PlayStation's release, the game has variously been tested on both the PlayStation 2 and PlayStation 3 systems, all displaying the same freeze issue, which solidifies the fact that all ROM versions that have been stated to work perfectly fine are derived from the 2001 patched disc.

References

External links

 

1998 video games
Action-adventure games
PlayStation (console) games
PlayStation (console)-only games
Riverhillsoft games
Science fiction video games
Single-player video games
Video game sequels
Video games developed in Japan